Zarnukh (also Romanized as Zarnūkh; also known as Jīnūk and Jūnūq) is a village in Azghand Rural District, Shadmehr District, Mahvelat County, Razavi Khorasan Province, Iran. At the 2006 census, its population was 101, in 27 families.

References 

Populated places in Mahvelat County